Derek Phillips is a New Zealand former footballer who played as a goalkeeper. He represented the New Zealand national team at international level.

Phillips made his full All Whites debut in a 1–3 loss to New Caledonia on 8 October 1968 and ended his international playing career with six A-international caps to his credit, his final cap an appearance in a 0–2 loss to Israel on 1 October 1969.

References

External links
 

Year of birth missing (living people)
Living people
New Zealand association footballers
New Zealand international footballers
Association football goalkeepers